Elizabeth M. Tyler is Professor of Medieval Literature at the University of York. She is a co-director of the Centre for Medieval Literature at the University of Southern Denmark and the University of York. She is an expert in the literary culture of England from the ninth to the twelfth centuries.

Education 
Tyler received her DPhil from the University of Oxford in 1994. Her doctoral thesis was titled The Collocation of Words for Treasure in Old English Verse. The thesis used a study of the collocation of words for treasure to address the question of the relationship between the conventionality and originality of Old English verse.

Career 
Tyler was appointed at the University of York in 1995. She is an editor of an open-access journal, Interfaces: A Journal of Medieval European Literatures. She is a general editor for the Studies in the Early Middle Ages series, published by Brepols. She is an editorial board member for the Old English Series of the Dumbarton Oaks Medieval Library, published by Harvard University Press. Tyler is an executive committee member for Carmen: The Worldwide Medieval Network.

Bibliography 

 (ed. by Elizabeth M. Tyler and M. J. Toswell) Studies in English Language and Literature: 'Doubt Wisely', Papers in Honour of E.G. Stanley (London: Routledge, 1996)
 (ed. by Elizabeth M. Tyler) Treasure in the medieval West (York : York Medieval Press, 2000)
 Old English Poetics: the Aesthetics of the Familiar in Anglo-Saxon England (Cambridge: Cambridge University Press, 2006)
 (ed. by Elizabeth M. Tyler and Ross Balzaretti) Narrative and History in the Early Medieval West (Turnhout: Brepols, 2006)
 (ed.) Conceptualizing Multilingualism in Medieval England, c.800-c.1250 (Turnhout : Brepols, 2011)
 England in Europe: English Royal Women and Literary Patronage, c.1000-1150 (Toronto: University of Toronto Press, 2017)
 (ed. by Jennifer Jahner, Emily Steiner and Elizabeth M. Tyler) Medieval historical writing: Britain and Ireland, 500-1500 (Cambridge: Cambridge University Press, 2019)

References

External links 
 Worldcat author page: https://worldcat.org/identities/lccn-n95093967/
 University of York Staff Profile Page

Academic staff of York University
Women medievalists
Women academics
Medievalists
Year of birth missing (living people)
Living people